Praia Grande Bay ( or ) or Nam Van, officially known as Ou Mun, is a bay in Macau, China. Located on the east side of the Macau Peninsula, it served as the chief promenade in Macau. It was the site of the governor's palace, the administrative offices, the consulates, and the leading commercial establishments.  It has been credited as probably the "most depicted view of 19th-century Macau", and its most characteristic landmark for many years. The bay was confined by the Fortress of St. Francis in the north-east and the Fortress of Bomparto in the south-west. Only a few colonial buildings remain, and the landscape has been largely altered by land reclamation and high-rise buildings.

Gallery

See also
 Geography of Macau
 Victoria Harbour, Hong Kong

References 

Beaches of Macau
Bays of China
Water in Macau